Celle may refer to:

France

Germany
Celle, a city in Lower Saxony, Germany
Celle (district), a district in eastern Lower Saxony

Italy
Celle di Bulgheria, a municipality in the Province of Salerno, Campania
Celle di Macra, a municipality in the Province of Cuneo, Piedmont
Celle di San Vito, a municipality in the Province of Foggia, Apulia
Celle Enomondo, a municipality in the Province of Asti, Piedmont
Celle Ligure, a municipality in the Province of Savona, Liguria
Celle dei Puccini, a civil parish (frazione) of Pescaglia (LU), Tuscany

Slovenia
 an older name of Celje